White Dyke Sewer, also known as simply White Dyke, is a  long stream (brook) and drainage ditch of the Pevensey Levels in Hailsham, Wealden District of East Sussex, England, that is a tributary to Horse Eye Sewer.

Course 
Rising from a drainage basin located in the White Dyke Marsh marshland, White Dyke Sewer flows northeasterly until reaching the confluence of Crossing Sewer and Lewens Sewer, when it turns southeast. White Dyke Sewer then resumes its northeasterly course, giving rise to Down Sewer, before finally flowing into Horse Eye Sewer.

References 

Rivers of East Sussex
Rivers of the Pevensey Levels